William Mercer (14 March 1896 — 1975) was an English footballer. He made over 100 Football League appearances for Preston North End.

References

1896 births
1975 deaths
Footballers from Preston, Lancashire
English footballers
Association football wing halves
Blackpool F.C. players
Preston North End F.C. players
Lancaster City F.C. players
Boston Town F.C. (1920s) players
English Football League players